The Foundation for Education Support is a non-profit government-supported organization created to fund educational programs that promote the cooperation and communication of Russian gimnaziums, lyceums and secondary schools with leading national universities.

Its current major program is the support and development of Gimnazium Union of Russia, an open network or Russian gimnaziums, lyceums and secondary schools.

Andrei Fursenko, the Russian Education Minister introduced the Gimnazium Union of Russia and related projects on November 6, 2007, at a major conference in education held at Saint Petersburg State University.

The Foundation was founded and is mainly sponsored by Gazprom. Its activities, such as several recently introduced National science competitions, are a part of the National Priority Projects and are directly supported by Russian President-elect Dmitry Medvedev and the Russian Ministry of Education.

References

External links
 Official website of the Foundation for Education Support 
 Memorandum of Understanding between Russian Education Minister Andrei Fursenko and the Foundation President Tatyana Golubeva. February 11, 2008. 
 Gimnazium Union unites Russian gymnaziums nationwide. NTV  
 Forum of Gimnanium Union of Russia opened in Saint Petersburg. Rosbalt. 

Foundations based in Russia